Robert Horgan is a Welsh international lawn bowler.

Bowls career
In 2007 Horgan won the pairs gold medal and fours bronze medal at the Atlantic Bowls Championships.

He is a three times Welsh champion winning the 2003 & 2005 pairs and 2011 triples at the Welsh National Bowls Championships and became a British champion winning the 2006 pairs at the British Isles Bowls Championships.

References

Living people
Welsh male bowls players
Year of birth missing (living people)